

Plants

Pinophytes

Angiosperms

Newly described insects

Molluscs

Bivalves

Fish

Dinosaurs

Newly named dinosaurs
Data courtesy of George Olshevsky's dinosaur genera list.

Newly named birds

Plesiosaurs

New taxa

Pterosaurs
 Fossil jaw fragments containing multicusped teeth were found in Dockum Group rocks in western Texas. One fragment, apparently from a lower jaw, contained two teeth, each with five cusps. Another fragment, from an upper jaw, also contained several multi-cusped teeth. These finds are very similar to the pterosaur genus Eudimorphodon and may be attributable to this genus, although without better fossil remains it is impossible to be sure.

New taxa

Synapsids

Mammals

References

 
Paleontology
Paleontology 6